Stonehenge is a rural locality in the local government area (LGA) of Southern Midlands in the Central LGA region of Tasmania. The 2016 census recorded a population of 7 for the state suburb of Stonehenge.

History 
Stonehenge was gazetted as a locality in 1972. The name was taken from a property in the area.

Geography
Most of the boundaries are survey lines.

Road infrastructure 
Route C310 (Stonehenge Road / Inglewood Road) runs through from south to west.

References

Towns in Tasmania
Localities of Southern Midlands Council